Babakishi may refer to:
 Aghavnadzor, Kotayk, Armenia
 Buzhakan, Armenia